The 1970 Boise State Broncos football team represented Boise State College during the 1970 NCAA College Division football season, the third season of Bronco football (at the four-year level) and the first as members of the Big Sky Conference and   In the College Division, they played their home games on campus at the new Bronco Stadium in Boise, Idaho.

BSC played only three conference games, missing Idaho, Montana, and fellow new member Northern Arizona.

Schedule

NFL Draft
One Bronco was selected in the 1971 NFL Draft, which lasted seventeen rounds (442 selections).

References

Boise State
Boise State Broncos football seasons
Boise State Broncos football